William S. Patrick was a Michigan politician. He was elected as the twelfth mayor of the Village of Flint in 1869, serving a single 1-year term.

References

Mayors of Flint, Michigan
19th-century American politicians